Euchromia bourica is a moth of the subfamily Arctiinae. It was described by Jean Baptiste Boisduval in 1832. It is found in Indonesia on Ambon Island, Seram Island and Buru.

References

 

Moths described in 1832
Euchromiina